Elk Cove may refer to:

Elk Cove (Oregon), a meadow in the Mount Hood Wilderness in the U.S. state of Oregon
Elk Cove, Oregon, a fictional location in Tillamook County on the Oregon Coast that is the setting for the 1987 movie Overboard and the 2018 remake of the same name.